This is a list of stadiums that currently serve as the home venue for Football Bowl Subdivision college football teams. These include most of the largest stadiums in the United States.

Conference affiliations reflect those in the current 2022 season.

Current stadiums

1 – Largest football crowd. Larger attendance records may exist for other configurations of the stadium. Also, a few stadiums now have lower football capacity than in the past; one example is California Memorial Stadium, whose capacity dropped by more than 9,000 in its most recent renovation.2 – Year of most recent completed stadium expansion/major upgrade

Future stadiums
This list includes the following:
 Stadiums either under construction or confirmed to be built in the future.
 Existing stadiums of teams either (1) transitioning to FBS and not yet football members of FBS conferences, or (2) returning to FBS football.

Here, conference affiliations are those expected to be in effect when the stadium becomes an FBS venue, whether by opening, reopening, or a school's entry into provisional or full FBS membership.

See also

Road to College Football
Map of NCAA Division I FBS football stadiums
List of NCAA Division I FBS football programs
List of NCAA Division I FCS football stadiums
List of current National Football League stadiums
List of American football stadiums by capacity
List of U.S. stadiums by capacity
List of North American stadiums by capacity
List of stadiums by capacity

Notes
Capacity

Record

Other

References

External links
College Gridirons
College Stadiums on Ballparks.com
 Field Goal Stadium Quest
College Football Stadiums Tour
College Football Road Trip

NCAA Division I FBS
College football-related lists
Division I FBS
Stadiums
NCAA Division I FBS football
Football